SS Saltmarshe was a freight vessel built for the Wetherall Steamship Company Limited in 1907.

History

She was built by William Pickersgill and Company in Sunderland for the Wetherall Steamship Company Limited and launched on 9 May 1907. She was purchased in the same year by the Lancashire and Yorkshire Railway.

In 1922 the ship was transferred to the London and North Western Railway and in 1923 to the London, Midland and Scottish Railway.

She was sent for scrapping in December 1931.

References

1907 ships
Steamships of the United Kingdom
Ships built on the River Wear
Ships of the Lancashire and Yorkshire Railway
Ships of the London and North Western Railway
Ships of the London, Midland and Scottish Railway